At the 2015 European Games in Baku, five events of archery were contested, all in the target archery format, with recurve bows. The events took place at the Tofiq Bahramov Stadium over seven days of competition. The European Games format followed that of the Olympic Games with 64 men and 64 women competing in the recurve division, in individual and team events as well as in mixed team.

Qualification

A total of 128 athletes will compete at the Games. Each National Olympic Committee (NOC) is permitted to enter a maximum of six competitors, three per gender. NOCs that qualified teams for a particular gender were able to send a three-member team to the team event and also have each member compete in the individual event. Six places will be reserved for Azerbaijan as the host nation, on the condition that they enter three athletes per gender at the 2014 European Championships.
There will a total of five medal events and a capacity of 3,400. Archery will also offer the opportunity to win ranking points for Rio 2016 Summer Olympics qualification.

Medal summary

Medal table

References

External links
Results book

 
Sports at the 2015 European Games
European Games
2015